Whitehall Securities Corporation Ltd was formed in 1907 by  Weetman Pearson MP and his son Harold Pearson MP. Sir Weetman was nominated as President as well as being a founding director. The company was capitalised at £1,000,000. On 12 December 1990 the company name was changed to Pearson Management Services Ltd. The company formed part of what is now the Pearson PLC group of business interests.

Aviation interests

In 1929, Whitehall Securities became a financial investor of Airwork Services, a British private aviation conglomerate established by Nigel Norman and Alan Muntz the year before.

In 1935, Viscount Cowdray's younger son, Bernard Clive Pearson, took over the management of Whitehall Securities. By that time, Whitehall Securities had acquired shareholdings in a number of Britain's leading pre-World War II private airlines. Among these was Spartan Air Lines that was formed as a subsidiary to Spartan Aircraft Ltd which had been acquired by Whitehall Securities. In 1931 Spartan Aircraft's operations were allied to the Saunders-Roe company in which Whitehall Securities had taken a majority shareholding. In April 1935, Whitehall Securities and Jersey Airways formed United Airways as a sister airline to Spartan Air Lines.

Whitehall Securities had acquired a controlling shareholding in Hillman's Airways, which had become a public company in December 1934 following the death of Hillman's founder Ted Hillman. In September 1935, Hillman's Airways, Spartan Air Lines and United Airways merged to form Allied British Airways. A month later, the new airline shortened its name to British Airways. On 1 August 1936, British Airways took over British Continental Airways, and the following month it absorbed Crilly Airways. Whitehall Securities was joined as investor in the merged airline by the French banking company Emile Erlanger & Co. through Chairman, Leo d'Erlanger.

Whitehall Securities' financial involvement with the pre-war British Airways came to an end following the merger of the airline with Imperial Airways to form British Overseas Airways Corporation (BOAC) in 1940, which resulted in the industry's nationalisation.

Meanwhile in Scotland, Whitehall Securities had purchased two other independent airlines, Northern & Scottish Airways and Highland Airways, and on 12 August 1937, merged them into a new company, Scottish Airways. This played an important role in World War II, but the post-war nationalisation of independent airlines saw it merged into British European Airways in 1947.

In the post-war era, Airwork changed its name to British United Airways (BUA) on 19 May 1960 following Whitehall Securities' agreement to let Airwork [re-]use the United Airways name together with the prefix British. (This preceded BUA's official formation on 1 July of that year, when Airwork merged with Hunting-Clan Air Transport.) Whitehall Securities held 10% of the new group.

Other holdings

In 1951 Whitehall Securities Corporation purchased the Lawley Group, china manufacturers, wholesalers and retailers of china and glass, of London and Stoke-on-Trent. Whitehall Securities already owned Booths and Colcloughs together with a large number of ceramic and pottery manufacturers. This grouping became known as Allied English Potteries which was later absorbed into the Wedgwood group.

Citations

References
 (Google Books)
  (Google Books)
 

1907 establishments in England
Financial services companies established in 1907
Financial services companies of England